Kon is a census town in Thane district in the Indian state of Maharashtra.

Demographics
 India census, Kon had a population of 15,167. Males constitute 53% of the population and females 47%. Kon has an average literacy rate of 76%, higher than the national average of 59.5%: male literacy is 81%, and female literacy is 70%. In Kon, 15% of the population is under 6 years of age.

References

Cities and towns in Thane district